The 58th New York State Legislature, consisting of the New York State Senate and the New York State Assembly, met from January 6 to May 11, 1835, during the third year of William L. Marcy's governorship, in Albany.

Background
Under the provisions of the New York Constitution of 1821, 32 senators were elected on general tickets in eight senatorial districts for four-year terms. They were divided into four classes, and every year eight Senate seats came up for election. Assemblymen were elected countywide on general tickets to a one-year term, the whole Assembly being renewed annually.

State Senator John Birdsall resigned on June 5; and State Senator Louis Hasbrouck died on August 20, 1834; leaving vacancies in the Fourth and Eighth District.

Surveyor General Simeon De Witt died on December 3, 1834, leaving a vacancy to be filled by the Legislature.

At this time there were two political parties: the Democratic Party and the Whig Party.

The Whig state convention nominated State Senator William H. Seward for Governor, and Silas M. Stilwell for Lieutenant Governor.

The Democratic state convention met on September 10 at Herkimer and nominated Gov. Marcy and Lt. Gov. Tracy for re-election.

Elections
The State election was held from November 3 to 5, 1834. Gov. William L. Marcy and Lt. Gov. John Tracy were re-elected.

Coe S. Downing (1st D.), John P. Jones (2nd D.), Abraham L. Lawyer (3rd D.), Samuel Young (4th D.), Abijah Beckwith (5th D.), Levi Beardsley (6th D.), Chester Loomis (7th D.), Isaac Lacey (8th D.); and Assemblymen Jabez Willes (4th D.) and Chauncey J. Fox (8th D.) were elected to the Senate. Lacey and Fox were Whigs, the other eight were Democrats.

Sessions
The Legislature met for the regular session at the Old State Capitol in Albany on January 6, 1835; and adjourned on May 11.

Charles Humphrey (D) was elected Speaker with 91 votes against 31 for Mark H. Sibley (W).

Upon taking their seats in the Senate, Young and Willes (4th D.), and Fox and Lacey (8th D.), drew lots to decide which one of the two senators elected in each district would serve the short term, and which one the full term. Young and Fox drew the short term, and Willes and Lacey the full term.

On January 20, the Legislature elected William Campbell as Surveyor General; and Amasa J. Parker as a regent of the University of the State of New York.

On February 2, the Legislature re-elected Attorney General Greene C. Bronson and State Treasurer Abraham Keyser.

On May 6, Canal Commissioner Michael Hoffman resigned.

On May 9, the Legislature elected Heman J. Redfield to succeed Hoffman; and Washington Irving as a regent of the University of the State of New York. Redfield declined to take office, and Gov. Marcy appointed John Bowman to fill the vacancy temporarily.

State Senate

Districts
 The First District (4 seats) consisted of Kings, New York, Queens, Richmond and Suffolk counties.
 The Second District (4 seats) consisted of Delaware, Dutchess, Orange, Putnam, Rockland, Sullivan, Ulster and Westchester counties.
 The Third District (4 seats) consisted of Albany, Columbia, Greene, Rensselaer, Schenectady and Schoharie counties.
 The Fourth District (4 seats) consisted of Clinton, Essex, Franklin, Hamilton, Montgomery, St. Lawrence, Saratoga, Warren and Washington counties.
 The Fifth District (4 seats) consisted of Herkimer, Jefferson, Lewis, Madison, Oneida and Oswego counties.
 The Sixth District (4 seats) consisted of Broome, Chenango, Cortland, Otsego, Steuben, Tioga and Tompkins counties.
 The Seventh District (4 seats) consisted of Cayuga, Onondaga, Ontario, Seneca, Wayne and Yates counties.
 The Eighth District (4 seats) consisted of Allegany, Cattaraugus, Chautauqua, Erie, Genesee, Livingston, Monroe, Niagara and Orleans counties.

Note: There are now 62 counties in the State of New York. The counties which are not mentioned in this list had not yet been established, or sufficiently organized, the area being included in one or more of the abovementioned counties.

Members
The asterisk (*) denotes members of the previous Legislature who continued in office as members of this Legislature. Jabez Willes and Chauncey J. Fox changed from the Assembly to the Senate.

Employees
 Clerk: John F. Bacon

State Assembly

Districts

 Albany County (3 seats)
 Allegany County (1 seat)
 Broome County (1 seat)
 Cattaraugus County (1 seat)
 Cayuga County (4 seats)
 Chautauqua County (2 seats)
 Chenango County (3 seats)
 Clinton County (1 seat)
 Columbia County (3 seats)
 Cortland County (2 seats)
 Delaware County (2 seats)
 Dutchess County (4 seats)
 Erie County (2 seats)
 Essex County (1 seat)
 Franklin County (1 seat)
 Genesee County (3 seats)
 Greene County (2 seats)
 Hamilton and Montgomery counties (3 seats)
 Herkimer County (3 seats)
 Jefferson County (3 seats)
 Kings County (1 seat)
 Lewis County (1 seat)
 Livingston County (2 seats)
 Madison County (3 seats)
 Monroe County (3 seats)
 The City and County of New York (11 seats)
 Niagara County (1 seat)
 Oneida County (5 seats)
 Onondaga County (4 seats)
 Ontario County (3 seats)
 Orange County (3 seats)
 Orleans County (1 seat)
 Oswego County (1 seat)
 Otsego County (4 seats)
 Putnam County (1 seat)
 Queens County (1 seat)
 Rensselaer County (4 seats)
 Richmond County (1 seat)
 Rockland County (1 seat)
 St. Lawrence County (2 seats)
 Saratoga County (3 seats)
 Schenectady County (1 seat)
 Schoharie County (2 seats)
 Seneca County (2 seats)
 Steuben County (2 seats)
 Suffolk County (2 seats)
 Sullivan County (1 seat)
 Tioga County (2 seats)
 Tompkins County (3 seats)
 Ulster County (2 seats)
 Warren County (1 seat)
 Washington (3 seats)
 Wayne County (2 seats)
 Westchester County (3 seats)
 Yates County (1 seat)

Note: There are now 62 counties in the State of New York. The counties which are not mentioned in this list had not yet been established, or sufficiently organized, the area being included in one or more of the abovementioned counties.

Assemblymen
The asterisk (*) denotes members of the previous Legislature who continued as members of this Legislature. Herman I. Quackenboss changed from the Senate to the Assembly.

The party affiliations follow the vote on State officers on January 20, February 2 and May 9.

Employees
 Clerk: Philip Reynolds Jr.
 Sergeant-at-Arms: Daniel Dygert
 Doorkeeper: Nathan Manson Jr.
 Assistant Doorkeeper: James M. D. Carr

Notes

Sources
 The New York Civil List compiled by Franklin Benjamin Hough (Weed, Parsons and Co., 1858) [pg. 109 and 441 for Senate districts; pg. 130 for senators; pg. 148f for Assembly districts; pg. 216f for assemblymen]
 The History of Political Parties in the State of New-York, from the Ratification of the Federal Constitution to 1840 by Jabez D. Hammond (4th ed., Vol. 2, Phinney & Co., Buffalo, 1850; pg. 442 to 454)

058
1835 in New York (state)
1835 U.S. legislative sessions